is a caldera lake in Akan National Park, eastern Hokkaidō, Japan. As with many geographic names in Hokkaidō, the name derives from the Ainu language. It is the largest caldera lake in Japan in terms of surface area, and sixth largest lake in Japan. It is also the largest lake in Japan to freeze over completely in winter. The name Lake Kutcharo is also sometimes used.

The lake's central island, Nakajima (not to be confused with another island of the same name in Lake Tōya), is a stratovolcano. It is also Japan's largest recursive island. Volcanic gases render the lake water acidic, and it supports few fish except in areas where inflowing streams dilute the water. Rainbow trout, which are also resistant to fairly acidic water, have been artificially introduced. In 1951, a rare form of cicada (Hyalessa maculaticollis) was discovered, and is now protected by the government. The lake is also on the migratory path of the whooper swan.

Along the lake shore are several outdoor hot springs and a sand beach with naturally heated sand and hot ground water. Wakoto Peninsula extending into the lake has a number of active sulfurous vents.

The lake is also known as Japan's Loch Ness, after numerous reported sightings on a lake monster dubbed Kusshii by the press from 1973.

See also

Tourism in Japan

References

External links 
 Geological Survey of Japan
  |  Kussharo Caldera | Kussharo Nakajima
 
  Teshikaga Navi - Teshikaga Town 

Calderas of Hokkaido
Volcanic crater lakes
Lakes of Hokkaido
Pleistocene calderas
VEI-6 volcanoes